Nobuyuki "Nobu" Matsuhisa (松久 信幸 Matsuhisa Nobuyuki; born March 10, 1949) is a Japanese celebrity chef and restaurateur known for his fusion cuisine blending traditional Japanese dishes with Peruvian ingredients. His signature dish is black cod in miso. He has restaurants bearing his name in several countries. He has also played small parts in three major films.

Biography
Nobu was born in Saitama, Japan. When he was eight years old, his father died in a traffic crash, and he and his two older brothers were raised by his mother. Immediately following the death of his father, Nobu began to travel the world. Over the next decade, while being raised by his mother, Nobu Matsuhisa experienced many cultures and witnessed first hand the reaches of poverty and hunger.  His experience influenced his efforts later in life to give back to communities through his business ventures. 

After graduating from high school, with fifteen years, he began working as a dishwasher at the restaurant Matsue Sushi in Shinjuku, Tokyo. It was in the same restaurant, where he was trained as a Sushi master. After seven years, he was invited by a regular customer, who was a Peruvian of Japanese descent, to open a Japanese restaurant in Peru. In 1973 at age 24, he moved to Lima, Peru and opened a restaurant with the same name of Matsue in partnership with his sponsor. Nobu was unable to find many of the ingredients he took for granted in Japan and had to improvise, and it was here that he developed his unique style of cuisine that incorporated Peruvian ingredients into Japanese dishes. But after three years, the restaurant had to close. After a short stay in Argentina, where he tried to open a new restaurant, he eventually moved to Anchorage, Alaska, and opened his own restaurant there. About two weeks after the grand opening there was an electrical fire  and the restaurant burned down.

In 1977, he moved to Los Angeles and worked at Japanese restaurants "Mitsuwa" and "Oshou." In 1987, he opened his own restaurant "Matsuhisa" on La Cienega Boulevard in Los Angeles, California. It was in the Matsuhisa he came to know Robert De Niro, who encouraged him to open a restaurant in New York. By 1994, he laid the foundation to a new restaurant chain, as he opened the first "Nobu" in Tribeca, New York in a joint venture between Robert De Niro, Drew Nieporent,  Meir Teper and himself. In 1995 he received the James Beard Foundation Award and was nominated for it several times in the following years.

Acting
Nobu has had small roles in three major films: in Casino (1995) alongside his business partner Robert De Niro, in Austin Powers in Goldmember (2002), and in Memoirs of a Geisha (2005).

Hotels
 there are at least 15 Nobu hotels, including locations in Chicago, Ibiza, Las Vegas, two in London, Los Cabos, Malibu, Manila, Marbella, Miami Beach, Palo Alto, Warsaw, Perth, Australia, Doha and Barcelona.

Criticism
Nobu restaurants sell Atlantic bluefin tuna, formerly an endangered species. As a result, from press and campaigning pressure, they offered to add a warning on their menu, but this was considered inadequate by conservationists to help the spiral of demand and market price that leads to overfishing.

Books

See also
 List of restaurants in the Las Vegas Valley

References

External links
 Nobu Matushisa's official website
 

1949 births
Japanese male actors
Japanese chefs
Living people
People from Saitama Prefecture
Japanese emigrants to the United States
Head chefs of Michelin starred restaurants